Lord River may refer to:

 Lord River (Canada), British Columbia
 Lord River (New Zealand), West Coast Region

See also
 Lords River
 Lord of the River (disambiguation)
 Lord Rivers